Cathubodua ("battle crow") is the name of a Gaulish battle goddess.

Etymology 
Cathubodua is the name of a Gaulish goddess derived from a single inscription at Mieussy in Haute Savoie, eastern France, which actually reads ATHVBODVAE AVG SERVILIA TERENTIA S L M. The text's restitution as Cathubodua depends on the assumptions that an initial C has been lost and that the personal names ATEBODVAE, ATEBODVVS and ATEBODVI in 3 other inscriptions in modern Austria and Slovenia are unrelated.

In the Gaulish language, the name Cathubodua is believed to mean battle-crow.  Etymological lexical forms reconstructed in the University of Wales' Proto-Celtic lexicon, suggest that the name is likely to be ultimately derived from the Proto-Celtic *Katu-bodwā, a word that could be interpreted as ‘battle-fighting’. Nonetheless it is this second element *bodwā which appears to be the Proto-Celtic root of the later form of the name Badhbh. The masculine form *bodwos ('fighting') developed in Gaelic into Bodb.

She appears to be similar to the Irish goddess Badb Catha; under this identification, Badb Catha would foresee the fate of warriors before the battle.

References

Gaulish goddesses
War goddesses